Adolf Friedrich may refer to:

Adolf Friedrich von Schack (1815–1894), German poet, literary historian, and art collector
Duke Adolf Friedrich of Mecklenburg (1873–1969), German colonial politician and African explorer 
Adolf Frederick, King of Sweden (1710–1771)
Adolphus Frederick II, Duke of Mecklenburg-Strelitz (1658–1708)
Adolphus Frederick VI, Grand Duke of Mecklenburg-Strelitz (1882–1918)